Iryna Herashchenko may refer to:

Iryna Herashchenko (politician) (born 1971), Ukrainian journalist and politician
Iryna Herashchenko (athlete) (born 1995), Ukrainian high jumper